Jonathan Michael Howard (born April 27, 1985 in Mechanicsburg, Pennsylvania) is an American musician, songwriter, record producer and entrepreneur. He was the lead guitarist for the rock band Dizmas from 2003 to 2009, leaving after they went on hiatus and becoming a guitarist for the band Stellar Kart. He left Stellar Kart in 2010 and served as a touring rhythm guitarist and keyboardist for Paramore until 2016. Jon’s brother, Joey, joined Paramore as touring bassist in 2016. In 2018, Jon co-founded the location scouting company Avvay.

Career

Production and Writing
Jon has co-written and produced songs performed by Dashboard Confessional, Illenium, Aaron Gillespie, and Natalie Taylor among others.

Dizmas
In 2004, shortly after graduating high-school, Jon moved to Lancaster, California to join the Forefront Records band, Dizmas. After hundreds of shows and three records, members of Dizmas moved on.

General Ghost
He formed the band General Ghost, together with Kyle Rictor. They released their first EP entitled "Give Me To The Waves" on January 17, 2012. This was followed from an EP, If Then, released on the same year, and a third EP titled Drifter Painter Drinker Sinner, released in 2014.

Touring
In the summer of 2010, Jon began touring with the band Paramore as an additional rhythm guitar player, keyboardist and percussionist. Howard has maintained this position until 2016 - he played his last shows as part of Paramore in March of that year, during the band's second "Parahoy! Cruise".

Personal life 
Jon is married to singer Natalie Taylor.

References

External links 
Official site

1985 births
Living people
Songwriters from Pennsylvania
American performers of Christian music
People from Mechanicsburg, Pennsylvania
People from Lancaster, California
Songwriters from California
Guitarists from California
21st-century American guitarists